Virgilio Abelardo Godoy Reyes (1 May 1934 in León – 17 November 2016 in Managua) was a Nicaraguan politician who served as the vice president of his respective Central American nation from 25 April 1990 until he resigned in October 1995 to run for president in the 1996 presidential election.

Godoy was one of the founding members of PLI. He was elected in the 1990 presidential ticket of National Opposition Union as running mate of Violeta Barrios de Chamorro.

Godoy was twice an unsuccessful candidate for president – in the 1984 Nicaraguan general election and in the 1996 Nicaraguan general election.

He worked as professor in National Autonomous University of Nicaragua–León.

References

1934 births
2016 deaths
Vice presidents of Nicaragua
Independent Liberal Party (Nicaragua) politicians